Ernst Hufschmid (born October 9, 1910, date of death unknown) was a Swiss field handball player who competed in the 1936 Summer Olympics.

He was part of the Swiss field handball team, which won the bronze medal. He played all five matches.

External links
profile

1910 births
Field handball players at the 1936 Summer Olympics
Olympic bronze medalists for Switzerland
Olympic handball players of Switzerland
Swiss male handball players
Year of death missing
Olympic medalists in handball
Medalists at the 1936 Summer Olympics